The Confederation of African Rugby was allotted one place in the 1999 Rugby World Cup by direct qualification (Africa 1) and one place in the repechage tournament.

Nine teams participated in the qualification tournament for Africa which was held in four stages. The first two stages (Rounds 1 and 2) were played in 1997  and the last two stages (Rounds 3 and 4) were played in 1998.

The three lowest ranked sides played a single round robin tournament (drawn for home or away), with top placed team progressing to the next round and the other two teams dropping out. Rounds two and three were played in a similar fashion – the three lowest ranked remaining sides (i.e. the winner of the previous round and the next two lowest ranked teams) played a single round robin tournament (drawn for home or away). 

The final stage changed the pattern in that the top two teams from round three progressed to round four, and all matches were played in Rabat, Morocco.

Round 1

Round 2

|- bgcolor="C0FFC0"
|||2||1||0||1||63–17||4
|-
|||2||1||0||1||30–48||4
|-
|||2||1||0||1||42–70||4
|}

Round 3

|- bgcolor="C0FFC0"
|||2||1||0||1||69–41||4
|- bgcolor="C0FFC0"
|||2||1||0||1||49–46||4
|-
|||2||1||0||1||29–60||4
|}

Round 4

All round 4 matches were held in Rabat, Morocco.

|- bgcolor="C0FFC0"
|||3||3||0||0||78–32||9
|- bgcolor="#ffffcc"
|||3||2||0||1||29–29||7
|-
|||3||1||0||2||55–54||5
|-
|||3||0||0||3||13–60||3
|}

Namibia qualified for RWC 1999, Morocco qualified for repechage.

References

1999
Africa
1997 in African rugby union
1998 in African rugby union